A bank barrow, sometimes referred to as a barrow-bank, ridge barrow, or ridge mound, is a type of tumulus first identified by O.G.S. Crawford in 1938.

In the United Kingdom, they take the form of a long, sinuous, parallel-sided mound, approximately uniform in height and width along its length, and usually flanked by ditches on either side. They may be the result of a single phase of construction, or be the result of the addition of one or more linear extensions to the bank of a pre-existing barrow. Although burials have been found within the mound, no burial chambers as such have been identified in bank barrows. These ancient monuments are of middle Neolithic date.

There exist fewer than 10 bank barrows in the United Kingdom; examples may be found at
 Maiden Castle, Broadmayne and Martin's Down in Dorset;
 Long Low near Wetton in Staffordshire.

References and further reading

External links
Bank Barrow monument class description from English Heritage
Bank barrow search results from the Megalithic Portal

Stone Age Britain
Types of monuments and memorials
Barrows in England